"Polyester Girl" is a song by Australian rock band Regurgitator. The song was released in May 1998 as the third single from the band's second studio album Unit. "Polyester Girl" peaked at No. 14 in Australia and No. 16 in New Zealand and it also ranked at No. 26 on Triple J's Hottest 100 in 1998.

Content 
The release of Polyester Girl has been described as the peak of Regurgitator's career; it was their highest selling single and has been credited with helping the album Unit reach sales of over 240,000. The song was a radio hit in Australia, with Allmusic describing it as one of the highlights from the album. Polyester Girl has been called a "socially challenging" song, and has also being described as Regurgitator's "anti-commercialism anthem". When questioned if he would have done anything different on the album Unit, Regurgitator frontman Quan Yeomans cited Polyester Girl, stating "it's one of those throwaway things that was done so quickly and so sillily. Maybe I would do that again, but then that's the most successful track we've ever released."  Drums and keyboards heard in the song were synthesised using a Roland MC-303. Polyester Girl is said to be about a man "pledging fidelity to a sex doll." A "romantic trauma" occurs when the product breaks and has to be sent away for repairs.

Music video

Described as having "Nintendo 64" quality graphics, the music video for the song is entirely digitally animated. It features a chrome silver female with large breasts and an exaggerated hourglass figure dancing, at times synchronised with two identical figures. Dancing footage is intercut with advertisements to purchase one of the dancing figures, termed a "Polyester Girl". Described in the video as an "All Amazing PETCOM", the Polyester Girl is advertised as being mentally active, being made from elasto-plastic and featuring ionic suspension. The ability to customise a Polyester Girl's facial features, hair and wardrobe are shown, and viewers are encouraged to purchase a 'hover file' for their product.

The music video was nominated for Best Video at the 1998 ARIA Music Awards.

Track listings

Charts

Weekly charts

Year-end charts

Certification

Release history

References

1998 singles
1997 songs
Regurgitator songs
Songs written by Quan Yeomans
Song recordings produced by Magoo (Australian producer)
Warner Music Australasia singles